La Seu d'Urgell Cathedral, otherwise Urgel Cathedral of the Cathedral of Santa Maria d'Urgell, is a Roman Catholic cathedral located in the city of la Seu d'Urgell (Alt Urgell) in Catalonia. It is the seat of the Bishops of Urgell, who are also Co-Princes of Andorra. The cathedral is considered unique  within Catalan Romanesque architecture for the Italianate-style features on the ornaments of its west front.

The construction of the cathedral was begun in 1116 to designs by the master mason Ramon Llambard and is therefore one of the oldest cathedrals in Catalonia. It is the source of the name of the city: originally referred to as the City of Urgell, it is now called "See of Urgell" (La Seu d'Urgell), derived from the Latin Sedes Urgelli, meaning that the town is the episcopal seat.

The cathedral is dedicated to the Virgin Mary, patroness of the city, and has a 13th-century statue known as the Mother of God of Urgell (Mare de Déu d'Urgell) and also as the Virgin of Andorra.

The cathedral has had several restorations in the 20th century. The first was initiated by Josep Puig i Cadafalch in 1918. Between 1955 and 1974 the church was restored again. During these works, the unfinished parts of the cathedral were covered with stone. In addition, some of the added parts were removed to recover the external aspect of the original cathedral. Part of the façade was recovered and the interior was reformed, which had been somewhat disfigured by the plaster cover applied to it in the 18th century.

The 16th-century composer Joan Brudieu was maestro di capilla of the cathedral from 1548 to 1591.

Further reading
DDAA. Universidad de Oviedo. Arte e Identidades Culturales: Actas del XII congreso nacional del comité español de Historia del Arte (in Spanish), 1999. . 
Bassegoda Nonell, Joan. «El caso de la catedral de la Seu d'Urgell». In: Espacio, Tiempo y Forma: Historia del Arte t. 3. Proyectos barrocos para la Seu d'Urgell (in Spanish), 1990. 
Carbonell, Eduard; Cirici, Alexandre. Edicions 62. Grans monuments romànics i gòtics, 1977.  
Carrero Santamaría, Eduardo. «La Seu d'Urgell, el último conjunto de iglesias. Liturgia, paisaje urbano y arquitectura». In: CSIC, Inst. Mila i Fontanals, U.E.I. de Estudios Medievales. Anuario de estudios medievales, 2010. 
Junyent, Eduardo. L'Abadia de Montserrat. Catalunya romànica: l'arquitectura del segle XII, 1976. . 
Puig i Cadafalch, Josep. Institut d'Estudis Catalans. Escrits d'arquitectura, art i política, Xavier Barral i Altet, 2003 (Volum 62 de Memòries de la Secció Històrico-Arqueològica). .

La Seu d'Urgell
Buildings and structures in the Province of Lleida
Roman Catholic cathedrals in Catalonia
Basilica churches in Spain